Holly Patricia Hunter (born March 20, 1958) is an American actress.  Hunter won the Academy Award for Best Actress for her performance as Ada McGrath in the 1993 drama film The Piano. She earned three additional Academy Award nominations for Broadcast News (1987), The Firm (1993), and Thirteen (2003). She won two Primetime Emmy Awards for Outstanding Lead Actress in a Limited Series or Movie for the television films Roe vs. Wade (1989) and The Positively True Adventures of the Alleged Texas Cheerleader-Murdering Mom (1993). She also starred in the TNT drama series Saving Grace (2007–2010).

Hunter's other film roles include Raising Arizona (1987), Home for the Holidays (1995), O Brother, Where Art Thou? (2000), The Incredibles (2004), Batman v Superman: Dawn of Justice (2016), and The Big Sick (2017),  the latter of which earned her a Screen Actors Guild Award nomination for Outstanding Performance by a Female Actor in a Supporting Role.

Early life
Hunter was born in Conyers, Georgia, the daughter of Marguerite "Dee Dee" (née Catledge), a homemaker, and Charles Edwin Hunter, a part-time sporting goods company representative and farmer with a 250 acre farm. She is the youngest of six children. Her parents encouraged her talent at an early age, and her first acting part was as Helen Keller in a fifth-grade play. She is unable to hear with her left ear due to a childhood case of the mumps. The condition sometimes leads to complications at work, and some movie scenes have to be altered from the script for her to use her right ear. She is irreligious. She began acting at Rockdale County High School in the early 1970s, performing in local productions of Oklahoma, Man of La Mancha, and Fiddler on the Roof. Hunter earned a degree in drama from Carnegie Mellon University in Pittsburgh, and for a while performed in the theater scene there, playing ingenue roles at City Theater, then named the City Players.

Career

Hunter moved to New York City and roomed with fellow actress Frances McDormand, living in the Bronx "at the end of the D [subway] train, just off 205th Street, on Bainbridge Avenue and Hull Avenue". A chance encounter with playwright Beth Henley, when the two were trapped alone in an elevator, led to Hunter's being cast in Henley's plays Crimes of the Heart (succeeding Mary Beth Hurt on Broadway), and Off-Broadway's The Miss Firecracker Contest. "It was like the beginning of 1982. It was on 49th Street between Broadway and Eighth [Avenue] ... on the south side of the street," Hunter recalled in an interview. "[We were trapped] 10 minutes; not long. We actually had a nice conversation. It was just the two of us." 

Hunter made her film debut in the 1981 slasher movie The Burning. After moving to Los Angeles in 1982, Hunter appeared in TV movies before being cast in a supporting role in 1984's Swing Shift. That year, she had her first collaboration with the writing-directing-producing team of brothers Ethan Coen and Joel Coen, in Blood Simple, making an uncredited appearance as a voice on an answering-machine recording. More film and television work followed until 1987, when she earned a starring role in the Coens' Raising Arizona and was nominated for an Academy Award for her performance in Broadcast News, after which Hunter became a critically acclaimed star. 

Hunter went on to the screen adaptation of Henley's Miss Firecracker; Steven Spielberg's Always, a romantic drama with Richard Dreyfuss; and the made-for-TV 1989 docudrama Roe vs. Wade about the Supreme Court case Roe v. Wade. Following her second collaboration with Dreyfuss, in Once Around, Hunter garnered critical attention for her work in two 1993 films, resulting in her being nominated for two Academy Awards the same year: Hunter's performance in The Firm won her a nomination as Best Supporting Actress, while her portrayal of a mute Scottish woman entangled in an adulterous affair with Harvey Keitel in Jane Campion's The Piano won her the Best Actress award. Hunter went on to star in the comedy-drama Home for the Holidays and the thriller Copycat, both in 1995. Hunter appeared in David Cronenberg's Crash and as a sardonic angel in A Life Less Ordinary. The following year, Hunter played a recently divorced New Yorker in Richard LaGravenese's Living Out Loud; starring alongside Danny DeVito, Queen Latifah, and Martin Donovan. Hunter rounded out the 1990s with a minor role in the independent drama Jesus' Son and as a housekeeper torn between a grieving widower and his son in Kiefer Sutherland's drama Woman Wanted. Following a supporting role in the Coens' O Brother, Where Art Thou?, Hunter took top billing in the same year's television movie Harlan County War, an account of labor struggles among Kentucky coal-mine workers. Hunter would continue her small screen streak with a role in When Billie Beat Bobby, playing tennis pro Billie Jean King in the fact-based story of King's exhibition match with Bobby Riggs; and as narrator of Eco Challenge New Zealand before returning to film work with a minor role in the 2002 drama Moonlight Mile. The following year found Hunter in the redemption drama Levity.

In 2003, Hunter had the role of a mother named Melanie Freeland, whose daughter is troubled and going through the perils of being a teenager in the film Thirteen. The film was critically acclaimed along with Hunter and her co-stars and earned her nominations for the Academy Award and Golden Globe Award for Best Supporting Actress. In 2004, Hunter starred alongside Brittany Murphy in the romantic satire Little Black Book, and provided the voice for Helen Parr (also known as Elastigirl) in the acclaimed computer-animated superhero film, The Incredibles. She reprised the role in the Disney Infinity video game series, and in the film's long awaited sequel Incredibles 2 in 2018.

In 2005, Hunter starred alongside Robin Williams in the black comedy-drama The Big White. Hunter became an executive producer, and helped develop a starring vehicle for herself with the TNT cable-network drama Saving Grace, which premiered in July 2007. For her acting, she received a Golden Globe Award nomination, two Screen Actors Guild Award nominations, and an Emmy Award nomination. On May 30, 2008, Hunter received a star on the Hollywood Walk of Fame. In 2009, she was awarded the Women in Film Lucy Award. In 2016, Hunter played Senator Finch in Batman v Superman: Dawn of Justice. Hunter's likeness was used to portray Senator Finch in the Batman v Superman: Dawn of Justice tie-in prequel comics, released by Dr. Pepper on February 3, 2016. Hunter stars opposite Ted Danson in the 2021 NBC comedy Mr. Mayor.

Personal life 
Hunter was married to Janusz Kamiński, cinematographer of Schindler's List and Saving Private Ryan, from 1995 until 2001. She has been in a relationship with British actor Gordon MacDonald since 2001. The couple met in San Jose Repertory Theatre's production of playwright Marina Carr's By the Bog of Cats, in which she played a woman abandoned by her lover of 14 years, played by MacDonald. In January 2006, Hunter gave birth to the couple's twin sons, Claude and Press.

Filmography

Film

Television

Video games

Awards and nominations
In 1999, Hunter received the Golden Plate Award of the American Academy of Achievement. In 2016, Hunter was awarded an Honorary Doctorate degree by her alma mater, Carnegie Mellon University.

For film

For television

References

External links

 
 
 
 "What people don't know about Holly" (interview), The Guardian, November 22, 2003

1958 births
Living people
People from Conyers, Georgia
Actresses from Georgia (U.S. state)
American film actresses
American people of English descent
American people of Scottish descent
American people of Welsh descent
American television actresses
American voice actresses
Best Actress Academy Award winners
Best Actress AACTA Award winners
Best Drama Actress Golden Globe (film) winners
Cannes Film Festival Award for Best Actress winners
Carnegie Mellon University College of Fine Arts alumni
Outstanding Performance by a Lead Actress in a Miniseries or Movie Primetime Emmy Award winners
20th-century American actresses
21st-century American actresses
Silver Bear for Best Actress winners
Best Actress BAFTA Award winners
American agnostics